is a railway station on the Banetsu West Line in the city of Kōriyama, Fukushima, Japan, operated by East Japan Railway Company (JR East). It opened on 1 April 2017.

Lines
, the station is served by 18 ascending and 19 descending services daily.

Station layout
The station is unstaffed, and has a single side platform serving a single bidirectional track. The platform is long enough to accommodate six-car trains, and has a roof extending a length of three cars.

History

Details of the new station were formally announced by JR East on 15 September 2015. Construction work commenced in fiscal 2015, with the entire cost of approximately 2 billion yen borne by the city of Koriyama.

The station opened on 1 April 2017, with a ceremony attended by the mayor of Koriyama.

Passenger statistics
The station is expected to be used by an average of approximately 1,000 passengers daily.

Surrounding area
 Koriyama Kita Police Station
 Ohu University
 Fukushima Prefectural Koriyama-Kita Technical High School
 Tomita Junior High School
 Koken Junior High School
 Kotoku Elementary School

See also
 List of railway stations in Japan

References

External links

  

Stations of East Japan Railway Company
Railway stations in Fukushima Prefecture
Ban'etsu West Line
Railway stations in Japan opened in 2017
Kōriyama